Amravati district (Marathi pronunciation: [əmɾaːʋət̪iː]) is a district of Maharashtra state in central India. It is the administrative headquarter of Amravati division, which is one of the two divisions in Vidarbha (other being Nagpur), out of total 6 regions in state of Maharashtra.

The district is situated between 20°32' and 21°46' north latitudes and 76°37' and 78°27' east longitudes. The district occupies an area of 12,235 km². The district has boundaries with Betul District of Madhya Pradesh state to the north, and with the Maharashtra districts of Nagpur to the northeast, Chindwara district of Madhya Pradesh to the northeast Wardha to the east, Yavatmal to the south, Washim to the southwest, and Akola and Buldhana districts to the west.

Officer

Members of Parliament
Navneet Kaur Rana (IND) 
Ramdas Tadas (BJP)

Guardian Minister

list of Guardian Minister

District Magistrate/Collector

list of District Magistrate / Collector

History
In 1853, the present territory of Amravati district as a part of Berar Province was assigned to the British East India Company, following a treaty with the Nizam of Hyderabad. After the Company took over the administration of the province, it was divided into two districts. The present territory of the district became part of North Berar district, with headquarters at Buldhana. Later, the province was reconstituted and the territory of the present district became part of East Berar district, with headquarters at Amravati. In 1864, Yavatmal District (initially known as Southeast Berar district and later Wun district) was separated. In 1867, Ellichpur District was separated but in August, 1905, when the whole province was reorganized into six districts, it was again merged into the district. In 1903, it became part of the newly constituted province of Central Provinces and Berar. In 1956, Amravati district became part of Bombay State and after its bifurcation in 1960, it became part of Maharashtra state.

Geography
The climate is tropical. The northern part of the district is colder as compare to rest of the district due to the hilly regions of Chikhaldara.

Economy
In 2006 the Ministry of Panchayati Raj named Amravati one of the country's 250 most backward districts (out of a total of 640). It is one of the twelve districts in Maharashtra currently receiving funds from the Backward Regions Grant Fund Programme (BRGF).

Agriculture
Amravati is the main growing region for the cotton and pigeonpea 'Tur' in Chandur Railway, Dhamangaon, Teosa, Nandgaon Khandeshwar, Achalpur particularly. Ellachipur Sanman Chili pepper. Anjangaon Surji and Achalpur are known for growing betel leaves, piper longum, orange and banana. Morshi, Warud, Chandur Bazaar and Achalpur are known for growing Nagpuri oranges. Soybean has become a popular Kharif crop.

Rivers
The Wardha River forms the eastern boundary of the district, and the eastern portion of the district lies within its watershed. The Purna River drains the southwestern portion of the district, while the northwest is drained by the Tapti River. Other important rivers are Shahanoor and Chandrabhaga. Musali and Cherry are successfully introduced and cultivated now in Chikhaldara Hills.

The Purna rises near Bhainsdehi in the Betul district of Madhya Pradesh in the Satpudas. After flowing for about 50 km  in a general southerly and south-easterly direction enters the district. It travels across the district in a south-westerly direction dividing it into two halves, first through the Achalpur taluka and then along the boundary between the Amravati and Daryapur talukas. Finally, it turns due westwards forming the boundary of the district and continues further to join the Tapti near Muktainagar in Jalgaon district. The only significant left bank tributary of the Purna is the Pedhi. The first principal right bank tributary is the Arna. The next is a small river known as the Bodi. The next tributary, the Chandrabhaga is a very important one, flowing in a general south-westerly direction to join the Purna. The principal right bank affluent of the Chandrabhaga is the Bhuleshwari. The westernmost tributary of the Purna of some significance within the district is the Shahanur, with its tributary, the Bordi.

The following are some of the other rivers in Amravati District, with their tributaries.
 Burshi River
 Surkhi River
 Tigria River
 Khandu River
 Khapra River
 Sangiya River
 Gadaga River
 Vaan River
 Wardha River 
 Vidarbha River
 Bor River
 Pak Nala
 Maru River
 Narha River
 Chargar River
 Shahanoor River
 Bembala

Divisions
The district consists of six sub-divisions, which are further divided into 14 talukas. Amravati sub-division is divided into three talukas: Amravati, Bhatukali and Nandgaon Khandeshwar. Daryapur sub-division is further divided into two talukas: Anjangaon and Daryapur. Achalpur sub-division also consists of two talukas: Achalpur and Chandur Bazar. Morshi sub-division has also two talukas: Morshi and Warud. Dharni sub-division is also divided into two talukas: Dharni and Chikhaldara. Finally, Chandur (Railway) sub-division is divided into three talukas: Chandur (Railway), Tiosa and Dhamangaon.

There are eight Vidhan Sabha constituencies in this district. Six of these, Badnera, Amravati, Teosa, Anjangaon-Daryapur (SC), Melghat (ST) and Achalpur, are part of Amravati Lok Sabha constituency. The other two constituencies, Dhamangaon Railway and Morshi, are part of Wardha Lok Sabha constituency.

Major towns
Major towns include Achalpur, Paratwada, Anjangaon,. Chandur railway, Dhamangaon Railway, Hiwarkhed, Chikhaldara, Kholapur, Warud, Morshi, Rithpur, Shendurjana Ghat, Chandurbazar, Daryapur, Nandgaon Khandeshwar, Dharni, Teosa,. badnera, Nerpinglai

Demographics

According to the 2011 census Amravati district has a population of 2,888,445, roughly equal to the nation of Jamaica or the US state of Arkansas. This gives it a ranking of 131st in India (out of a total of 640). Its population growth rate over the decade 2001-2011 was 10.77%. Amravati has a sex ratio of 947 females for every 1000 males, and a literacy rate of 88.23%. Scheduled Castes and Scheduled Tribes make up 17.53% and 13.99% of the population respectively.

Languages

At the time of the 2011 Census of India, 66.83% of the population in the district spoke Marathi, 11.86% Urdu, 8.20% Korku, 7.35% Hindi, 1.85% Gondi and 1.09% Sindhi as their first language.

Marathi is the official and the most spoken language in the district. The dialect spoken here is called Varhadi dialect. Deccani Urdu is also prominent among the Muslim community. Korku and Gondi languages are also spoken by a significant number of people.

Transport
Important railway stations are Badnera Junction and Amravati Main Terminal under Bhusawal-Badnera Section of Bhusawal Division of Central Railway. The other stations under meter gauge are Wan Road Dhulghat and Dabka. These are under Purna - Khandwa section of South Central Railway. The stations under narrow gauge are Achalpur, Anjangaon Surji and Daryapur under Narrow Gauge Branch lines viz Murtajapur-Achalpur of Bhusawal Division of Central Railway.

Amravati - Narkhed line has been ready since January 2014. Railways are now available to travel from Narkhed to Bhusaval. Warud's railway station has been given the name Warud Orange City because it is the biggest exporter of oranges from all over India.

The Amravati - Chandur Bazar - Morshi - Warud Orange City - Narkher railway track is electrified.

Due to this Amravati - Narkher railway line ; Railway network in Amravati district become strong. It serves three talukas and some villages also have station so people travel via railway towards Amravati, Akola, Nagpur, Nanded, Bhusawal, Jaipur, Indore, Hyderabad and Bengaluru.

Amravati Airport is located at Belora, 15 kilometres south of Amravati on National Highway 53 (National Highway 6 (India, old numbering)) towards Akola.

Prominent persons

 Gadge Maharaj (1876-1956), social reformer
 Tukdoji Maharaj (1909-1968), social reformer and social worker and a great man in the whole world.
 Pratibha Patil, first female president of India (2008-2012)
 Panjabrao Deshmukh (1888-1965), social reformer, educationist and Central Agriculture Minister
 Gopalrao Khedkar, first President of Maharashtra Pradesh Congress Committee
 Suresh Bhat (1932-2003), Marathi poet, Marathi Ghazal Samrat
 Hemant Kanitkar, Indian cricketer
 Mohan Choti (1939-1992), Hindi movie comedy actor

Places of interest
Borgaon Dori is a well known pilgrimage village near south west from paratwada, on the banks of Saapan river previously known as Wardha river, Maharashtra, India.The temple of Lord Shiva attracts about a million Hindu pilgrims during the major yātrā (pilgrimages) in the month of jan to feb the comety of priti sangam situated at borgaon dori.
Melghat Tiger Reserve, of Project Tiger
Chikhaldara Hill Station is 85 km from Amravati via Paratwada
Gugarnal National Park
Wan Wildlife Sanctuary
Gawilgarh Fort
 Ambadevi temple - historic and ancient place to visit, related to 'Rukhminiharan' by Lord Krishna.
Manjarkhed Kasba - historic and ancient place to visit, Temple tirth kshetra Shree pataleshwar= gupteshwar deosthan
Savanga Vithoba, Awadhut Maharaj Temple
Hanuman Vyayam Prasarak Mandal (HVPM) Institute - India's biggest sport institute
Koudanyapur(Kundinapuri) birthplace of Rukmini, Koundanyapur
Semadoh
Shahanur Dam, Anjangaon Surji
Simbhora Dam (Upper Wardha Dam), Morshi
Salbardi pilgrimage of Lord Shiva, Morshi and religious place Swami Chakradhar 
Vedhapur pilgrimage of Lord Hanuman-ji, Warud
Musalkheda pilgrimage of Saint Yashwant Maharaj, Warud
The Leprosy Mission Community Hospital, Kothara, Paratwada
Bahiram Fare in December–February, Paratwada
Dharkhora Waterfall, Paratwada
Bakadari Waterfall, Paratwada
Ridhhapur, Kashi of Mahanubhav Panth. *Dattaziri and Ashtamahasiddhi Temple, Paratwada
Haud Katora, Achalpur
Chandrabhaga Dam, Paratwada
Vazzar Dam, Paratwada
Hazrat Shah Dulha Abdul Rehman Ghazi (R.A.) Dargah, Achalpur
Gayatri Temple, Paratwada
Muktagiri Temple, Paratwada
Deonath Math, Anjangaon Surji
Ekveera Temple, Murha, Anjangaon Surji
Vitthal Mandeer, Anjangaon Surji
Bettle leaf farming, Anjangaon Surji
Saint Gulab Baba Ashram, Takarkheda, Anjangaon Surji
Khandeshwar Bhagawan Temple, Nandgaon Khandeshwar
Mozari Gurukunj is 35 km from Amravati city on Amravati- Nagpur National Highway No. 6. It is famous for Mahasamadhi (tomb) of Great Sant (national reformer) Rastrasant Tukdoji Maharaj . Many people come to Mozari throughout year to attend various programs which are being organized to bring constructive changes in the society. 
Gulabrao maharaj Mandir, Chandur Bazar
Khandeshwar Temple (Hemadpanthi temple of Lord Shiva at Nandgaon Khandeshwar)
Changapur (famous Hanuman Temple)
Vaygaon (famous Ganesh Temple mentioned in Ganeshpurana)
Rinmochan (pilgrim)
Bhiltek (pilgrim)
Jahangirpur (famous Hanuman Temple)*Gawilgada-a historic fort at Chikhaldara
Usmaniya Masjid (famous mosque constructed by Nizam Of Hydrbad; a copy of Jama Masjid of Delhi)
Shri Kartik Swami Rath Yatra, Shirajgaon Kasba, Chandur Bazar, Amravati
Shri Bahiram Baba sansthan Balegaon Tq. Achalpur
Tapovan-Ashram for lepers providing living with self esteem & employing their skills and hard work, established by Dajisaheb Patwardhan.
 Shri Kondeshwar Temple lord shiva temple established by Kondnya Rishi near Badnera in Nandgaon Khandeshwar
Anandeshwar temple lasur near daryapur

Education in Amravati district

Engineering colleges
 Dhamangaon Education Society's College of Engineering & Technology, Dhamangaon Rly.
 Government College of Engineering, Amravati
 P. R. Patil Group of Educational Institutes
 Sipna Shikshan Prasarak Mandals College of Engineering, Amravati
 Prof. Ram Meghe Institute of Technology and Research, Badnera
 Prof. Ram Meghe College of Engineering and Management, Badnera
 HVPM College Of Engineering, Amravati
Dr. Rajendra Gode Institute of Technology & Research, Amravati (formerly known as IBSS College of Engineering, Amravati)
GH. Raisoni College of Engineering, Amravati
Shri Sant Gajanan Maharaj College of Engineering, Shegaon (SSGMCE, Shegaon)
Babasaheb Naik College of Engineering, Pusad 
Shri Dadasaheb Gawai Charitable Trusts Dr Smt Kamaltai Gawai Institute of Engineering and Technology, Amravati
College of Engineering and Technology, Akola

Polytechnic college 

Government Polytechnic Amravati
N.P.T.N. Paratwada-Semi Autonomous Institute
Panjabrao Deshmukh Polytechnic Shivaji Nagar, Amravati
Dr. Rajendra Gode Polytechnic Amravati
P. R. Pote (Patil) Polytechnic Amravati
Shree shivaji education society's Dr. Panjabrao Deshmukh Polytechnic Amravati
Dr. Ram Meghe Polytechnic Amravati
G. H. Raisoni Polytechnic, Amravati
B.J.E.S's Amravati Polytechnic Bhankheda
Kirti Polytechnic, Uttam Nagar, Amravati
V. Y. W. S. Polytechnic, Badnera

Other colleges
Shri Gurudev Vidya Mandir High school and Junior College Gurudevnagar, Mozari Gurukunj
Chitrakala Mahavidyalaya Gurudevnagar, Mozari Gurukunj
Gotkhade Education societies
Tilak Maharashtra Vidhyapith, Pune - Study Center Amravati 
Mahila Mahavidyalaya, Jog Chouk, Amravati
Indira Meghe Mahila Mahavidyalaya, Amravati
Shri. Ramkrishna Krida Vidhyalaya and College
Bhartiya Mahavidhyalaya, Amravati
Govt. Vidarbha Institute of Science and Humanities (GVISH) (formerly Vidarbha Maha Vidhyalaya (VMV))
Shri Shivaji Science and Arts College
Manbai Gujarati Junior College, Ambapeth, Rajkamal, Amravati
Brijlal BIyani Science College, Amravati
G. S. Tompe Arts, Commerce & Science College, Chandur-Bazar
Rural Institute, Amravati
Vidyabharati Mahavidyalaya, C.K. Naidu Road Camp, Amravati
Shri. Shivaji College of Agriculture Biotechnology
STK Gujarati Junior College, Ambapeth, Amravati
Government College of Pharmacy, Katora Naka, Amravati
Dr Gopalrao Khedkar Mahavidyalaya Khed
Bar. Ramrao Deshmukh Arts, Smt. Indiraji Kapadiya Commerce And Nyaymurthi Krishnarao Deshmukh Science College, Badnera
Vinayak Vidyamandir, Chhatri Talao, Amravati
N.A.D.College, Chandur Bazar
Degree College of Physical Education
shri shivaji college of agriculture, Amravati
Maharashtra Tantra Shikshan Vidyalaya (Mahatantra), Prashant Nagar, Amravati
Maharashtra Vyavasay Prashikshan Kendra, Bhambora, Taluka-Morshi Dist. Amravati
Maharashtra Tantra Shikshan Vidyalaya, Yawakar Wadi Warud enter - Mahesh Nagar
Y.D.V. D. Arts and Commerce College Teosa Dist. Amravati
Smt. Kesharbai Lahoti Mahavidyalaya
Urdu Saifee Jubilee Junior College, Paradise Colony, Walgaon Road, Amravati 444601

Medical colleges
Dr Panjabrao Deshmukh 
Takhatmal Shrivallabh Homoeopathic Medical College & Hospital
V.Y.W.S Dental College & Hospital
Pandit Jawaharlal Neheru Memorial Institute of Homeopathic Medical Sciences
Vidarbha Ayurveda College, 
H.V.P.M., Amravati
Shri Gurudev Ayurved College, Gurudeonagar, Mozari

Other institutions 
Om Computer, Yogiraj Generals Nh06 Gurudevnagar, Mozari Gurukunj
 Anmol Computer Institute Gopal Nagar Amravati
 Search Project Training Institute, Rathi Nagar, Amravati
Shree E Seva Kendra, Gopal Nagar Amravati

Folk arts
Dandar
Powada
Bhajan
Keertan
Kakada (Kakad aarti with Bhakti-feri in villages during winters)
Korku dance
Holi of Korku's

See also

Dhulghat railway station

References

External links

 Amravati district official website

 
Districts of Maharashtra
Amravati division
Vidarbha